Clef Records was an American jazz record label founded by Norman Granz in 1946. It became part of Verve Records, which Granz created in 1956. Clef recordings were, in the mid 1950s, licensed to Columbia (UK) who issued 78rpm discs with a special white label and the Clef logo.

Discography: 600 and 700 12 inch LP Series

See also
 List of record labels

References

External links
Clef Records on the Internet Archive's Great 78 Project

American record labels
Jazz record labels